White Ridge Provincial Park is a provincial park in British Columbia, Canada, and is located 4 km east of Gold River on Vancouver Island.

Geography
Adjoined to Strathcona Provincial Park, White Ridge forms the backdrop for the town of Gold River. It got its name from  the white limestone and karst topography of the area.

Recreation
Hiking and wilderness camping are permitted within park boundaries. There may also be potential for caving in the area.

References

External links
 BC Parks - White Ridge Provincial Park

Provincial parks of British Columbia
Northern Vancouver Island